WFH  is an initialism for working from home, also known as telecommuting or remote work.

WFH may also refer to:
 World Federation of Hemophilia, international non-profit organization 
 Work for hire, work subject to copyright that is created by an employee as part of his or her job